Chaetocrania is a genus of flies in the family Tachinidae.

Species
C. antennalis (Coquillett, 1897)

References

Diptera of North America
Exoristinae
Tachinidae genera
Taxa named by Charles Henry Tyler Townsend